John Patrick Mooney (January 22, 1933 – March 29, 2003) was a Canadian politician. He served in the Legislative Assembly of New Brunswick as a Liberal member from the constituency of Saint John South.

References

1933 births
2003 deaths
New Brunswick Liberal Association MLAs
Politicians from Saint John, New Brunswick